Sugar Creek is a stream  in the U.S. state of Ohio. It is a tributary of the Little Miami River. Sugar Creek was named for the sugar maple trees along its course.

See also
List of rivers of Ohio

References

Rivers of Greene County, Ohio
Rivers of Montgomery County, Ohio
Rivers of Ohio